Bow and Bromley by-election may refer to:

 1912 Bow and Bromley by-election
 1940 Bow and Bromley by-election